Archytas apicifer is a medium to large sized (approximately 10-15 mm) Nearctic tachinid fly. The species name was authored by the German entomologist Johann Friedrich Jaennicke (1867) and presumably named after the Greek classical philosopher and mathematician Archytas. The larvae are parasites of several caterpillar species.

Behavior and morphology 
The family Tachinidae is considered the second-largest in terms of number of species among all the diverse families of Diptera (two-winged true flies). There are about 10,000 species worldwide. Many tachinid flies are economically important parasites of other arthropods. Several genera are robust and brightly patterned and many possess conspicuous bristles on the head or on the 4th to 6th abdominal segments.

Diet 
Archytas apicifer adults feed on flower nectar, and are also known to be pollinators of some flowers.  Like many other tachinid flies, A. apicifer larvae are internal parasitoids of the Forest tent caterpillars and fall webworms in addition to the tomato fruitworm, corn earworm, and cutworms.

References

External links 

Insects used as insect pest control agents
Parasitic flies
Parasites of insects
Tachininae
Insects described in 1849
Taxa named by Francis Walker (entomologist)